William Eliot may refer to:

William Greenleaf Eliot (1811–1887), American educator, Unitarian clergyman, and founder of Washington University
William Eliot, 2nd Earl of St Germans (1767–1845), British diplomat and politician
William Eliot, 4th Earl of St Germans (1829–1881), British diplomat and Liberal politician
William Eliot (MP) (1586–1650), English politician
William Havard Eliot (1796–1831), architect and builder of the Tremont House in Massachusetts

See also
William Elliot (disambiguation)
Billy Elliot (disambiguation)
William Elliott (disambiguation)